Lauren Corrao is an American television executive. She became Executive Vice President of Original Programming and Development at Freeform in 2019. She is a former programming executive for Comedy Central, where she oversaw The Daily Show With John Stewart and The Colbert Report. She was also formerly co-president of Tornante TV and Vice President of MTV.

Corrao earned her B.A. from Brown University. She has two children.

References

Year of birth missing (living people)
Living people
Comedy Central executives
American television executives
Women television executives